The US Department of Veterans Affairs provides a wide variety of benefits, e.g., educational assistance (GI Bill), healthcare, assisted living, home loans, insurance, and burial and memorial services, for retired or separated United States armed forces personnel, their dependents, and survivors.  The VA provides compensation to disabled veterans  who suffer from a medical disorder or injury that was incurred in, or aggravated by, their military service, and which causes social and occupational impairment.  Many U.S. states also offer disability benefits for veterans.

Archival record of the benefits awarded to injured soldiers and veterans of the American Civil War began after 1865.  Union soldiers received a more committed pension archival effort on the part of the Federal government, thanks to superior databases in the North and a more stable bureaucratic oversight.  Turmoil during Reconstruction in the war-weary South made any effort at maintaining pension records difficult if not impossible.  Later university-led research projects would give insight into the history of pension provisions by the Federal government leading up to the Civil War.  These analysis shed light on the ever-changing role of compensation in American society and delved into the idea that American Revolutionary War soldiers received superior care after war than later Civil War veterans.

In 1932 veterans from the First World War marched on Washington as the Bonus Army, also known as the Bonus Expeditionary Force.

See also 
Benefits for United States veterans with post-traumatic stress disorder
Military dependent
Title 37 of the United States Code: Pay and Allowances of the Uniformed Services
Title 38 of the United States Code outlines the role of Veterans' Benefits in the United States Code
Veterans Affairs, the government agency or department of various governments
Veterans Benefits Administration, the US government agency

References

External links
US Dept. of Veterans Affairs' Benefits
military veteran-benefits web site

Social security in the United States
benefits
ben
Welfare economics